Melatonin receptor 1B, also known as MTNR1B, is a protein that in humans is encoded by the MTNR1B gene.

Function 

This gene encodes the MT2 protein, one of two high-affinity forms of a receptor for melatonin, the primary hormone secreted by the pineal gland. This gene product is an integral membrane protein that is a G-protein coupled, 7-transmembrane receptor. It is found primarily in the retina and brain; however, this detection requires RT-PCR. It is thought to participate in light-dependent functions in the retina and may be involved in the neurobiological effects of melatonin. Besides the brain and retina this receptor is expressed on the bone forming cells where it regulates their function in depositing bone.

Clinical significance 

Several studies have identified MTNR1B receptor mutations that are associated with increased average blood sugar level and around a 20 percent elevated risk of developing type 2 diabetes.  MTNR1B mRNA is expressed in human islets, and immunocytochemistry confirms that it is primarily localized in beta cells in islets.

Ligands 

The following MT2R ligands have selectivity over MT1R:

 Compound 3d: antagonist with sub-nM affinity
 Compound 18f: antagonist and compound 18g partial agonist: sub-nM affinity, >100-fold selectivity over MT1
 Compound 14: antagonist
 Compound 13: agonist

See also 
 Melatonin receptor
 Discovery and development of melatonin receptor agonists

References

Further reading

External links 
 

G protein-coupled receptors
Human proteins
1B